Thomas H. Cruikshank was chairman and CEO of Halliburton Company from 1989 to 1995.  He previously served as President and CEO from 1983 to 1989. During his tenure in the early 1990s, Halliburton provided extensive service to Kuwait in the aftermath of Operation Desert Storm. He was replaced at Halliburton by Dick Cheney. Cruikshank served on the Board of Directors of Lehman Brothers from 1996 until it collapsed in 2008. He also served on the boards of The Goodyear Tire & Rubber Company, The Williams Companies, Inc., Central & Southwest, Inc., Seagull Energy Company, Inc., Junior Achievement, Inc (including a term as chairman, Up With People (including a term as chairman), Rice University and California Institute of Technology.  He joined Halliburton in 1969. Prior to Halliburton he worked for Arthur Andersen & Co, (as a manager in the tax department), at Vinson & Elkins in Houston as a law partner and had a 3-year term in the U.S. Navy as a Lt.(jg). He is a graduate of Rice University and attended the University of Texas and University of Houston Law Schools.  He married Ann Coe in 1955 and had 3 children, Thomas H., Jr. (deceased in 2018), Kate and Stuart C.

He retired from Halliburton effective January 2, 2006.

References

Lehman Brothers people
Living people
Rice University alumni
Halliburton people
Year of birth missing (living people)